Anthidium collectum is a species of bee in the family Megachilidae, the leaf-cutter, carder, or mason bees.

Distribution
Middle America and North America

Synonyms
Synonyms for this species include:
Anthidium compactum_homonym Provancher, 1896
Anthidium angelarum Titus, 1906
Anthidium transversum Swenk, 1914
Anthidium puncticaudum Cockerell, 1925
Anthidium collectum bilderbacki Cockerell, 1938
Anthidium catalinense Cockerell, 1939
Anthidium clementinum Cockerell, 1939

References

External links
Images

collectum
Insects described in 1896